Levi Butler French (October 24, 1845 – February 19, 1923) was an American politician. He served in the South Dakota State Senate from 1889 to 1892. He also sat in the Dakota Territory Legislature in 1881.

References

1845 births
1923 deaths
People from Calhoun County, Michigan
People from Yankton, South Dakota
Members of the Dakota Territorial Legislature
19th-century American politicians
Republican Party South Dakota state senators